Masum Babul (31 December 1962 – 6 March 2023) was a Bangladeshi film dance director and choreographer. He won the Bangladesh National Film Award for Best Choreography twice, for the film Dola (1993) and Ki Jadu Karila (2008). He is also best known for the films Beder Meye Josna (1989), Koti Takar Kabin (2006), and Bikkhov (1994). Babul died on 6 March 2023, at age 60.

Selected films

Awards and nominations
National Film Awards

References

External links
 

1962 births
2023 deaths
Bangladeshi choreographers
Best Choreography National Film Award (Bangladesh) winners